Mohammed Amine Ennali (born 17 March 1997) is a Moroccan footballer who plays as a midfielder or forward for Dutch club .

References

External links
 

1997 births
Living people
Moroccan footballers
People from Tangier
Association football utility players
Amsterdamsche FC players
FC Volendam players
SBV Vitesse players
S.S. Lazio players
Achilles '29 players
Ittihad Tanger players
CD San Roque de Lepe footballers
Tweede Divisie players
Eerste Klasse players
Botola players
Tercera División players
Morocco youth international footballers
Moroccan expatriate footballers
Expatriate footballers in the Netherlands
Moroccan expatriate sportspeople in the Netherlands
Expatriate footballers in Italy
Moroccan expatriate sportspeople in Italy
Expatriate footballers in Spain
Moroccan expatriate sportspeople in Spain